Diego Barrios Pérez (born 30 July 1994) is a Spanish footballer who plays for Real Jaén as a goalkeeper.

Club career
Born in Martos, Jaén, Andalusia, Barrios made his senior debut with AD Alcorcón's reserves in 2013, in Tercera División. On 5 August of the following year, he moved to fellow league team CD Puerta Bonita.

Barrios signed for CDA Navalcarnero also in the fourth tier on 9 July 2015. On 12 July of the following year he joined another reserve team, CD Leganés B in the same category.

On 18 December 2016, as starter Jon Ander Serantes was injured and Iago Herrerín was sent off, Barrios made his first team – and La Liga – debut by coming on as a first half substitute for Rubén Pérez in a 1–1 home draw against SD Eibar. It was his maiden appearance for the first-team, and he subsequently moved to Segunda División B side UD San Sebastián de los Reyes the following 14 July.

On 25 July 2018, Barrios signed for Real Valladolid and was assigned to the B-team in the third division; After a spell at Lori FC in Armenia, Barrios returned to Spain in the summer 2020 and was without club until 21 December 2020, when he signed for Real Jaén.

References

External links
Leganés profile 

1994 births
Living people
Sportspeople from the Province of Jaén (Spain)
Spanish footballers
Spanish expatriate footballers
Footballers from Andalusia
Association football goalkeepers
La Liga players
Segunda División B players
Tercera División players
Armenian Premier League players
AD Alcorcón B players
CDA Navalcarnero players
CD Leganés B players
CD Leganés players
UD San Sebastián de los Reyes players
Real Valladolid Promesas players
FC Lori players
Real Jaén footballers
Spanish expatriate sportspeople in Armenia
Expatriate footballers in Armenia